Aloja may refer to:
 Aloja, Latvia, a town in Latvia
 Aloja (mythology), mythical creatures in Catalan legends